Harold Alan Furness (May 11, 1887 – October 1975) was an American cricketer. He played seven first-class matches between 1912 and 1913. Five of these were for the Philadelphia and the other two were for a combined Canada/USA team. All were played against Australia. He had a highest score of 106 not out in those seven games, his only first-class century.

References
 Cricket Archive profile
 Cricinfo profile

1887 births
1975 deaths
American cricketers
Philadelphian cricketers
People from Pittsfield, Maine
People from Haddonfield, New Jersey
Sportspeople from Maine